Antrisocopia is a genus of Copepods in the family Platycopiidae. There is at least one described species in Antrisocopia, A. prehensilis.

References

Further reading

 

Copepods
Articles created by Qbugbot